The Roman Catholic Diocese of San Pedro is a diocese located in the city of San Pedro in the Ecclesiastical province of Asunción in Paraguay.

History
 On June 5, 1978, the Diocese of San Pedro was established from the Diocese of Concepción

Leadership
 Bishops of San Pedro (Roman rite), in reverse chronological order
 Bishop Pierre Jubinville (6 November 2013 – present)
 Bishop Adalberto Martínez Flores (February 19, 2007 – March 14, 2012), appointed Bishop of Paraguay, Military
 Bishop Fernando Armindo Lugo Méndez, S.V.D. (March 5, 1994 – January 11, 2005). Bishop Lugo requested laicization in 2005 to allow him to run for President of Paraguay. The Church at first refused, going so far as to suspend him as bishop when he ran for office anyway, but eventually granted lay status after he was elected.
 Bishop Oscar Páez Garcete (June 5, 1978 – July 10, 1993), appointed Bishop of Alto Paraná

References

 GCatholic.org
 Catholic Hierarchy

Roman Catholic dioceses in Paraguay
Christian organizations established in 1978
Roman Catholic dioceses and prelatures established in the 20th century
San Pedro, Roman Catholic Diocese of
San Pedro Department, Paraguay